Séamus Moore (died 14 June 1940) was an Irish politician and businessman. He was first elected to Dáil Éireann as a Fianna Fáil Teachta Dála (TD) for the Wicklow constituency at the June 1927 general election. He was re-elected at each subsequent general election until his death in 1940. No by-election was held after his death.

He was Secretary of the Motor Traders' Association and lived at Beechmount Avenue in Ranelagh.

References

Year of birth missing
1940 deaths
Fianna Fáil TDs
Members of the 5th Dáil
Members of the 6th Dáil
Members of the 7th Dáil
Members of the 8th Dáil
Members of the 9th Dáil
Members of the 10th Dáil
Politicians from County Wicklow